Shaheed Chandu Stadium, previously known as Bogura Divisional Stadium or Bogura Stadium, is a stadium located in the northwestern side of Bogura district, Bangladesh.

History
The venue got its first international exposure when it hosted three group stage matches of 2004 Under-19 Cricket World Cup.

It became a test cricket venue on 8 March 2006, when it hosted a Test match between Sri Lanka and Bangladesh. It has a total capacity of 18,000. The ground has a field dimensions of 175m x 140m. The last international match played here was between Bangladesh and Zimbabwe in 2006, since then it has hosted domestic cricket .

Stats
Till 2006 the venue has hosted

 Test Matches - 1
 One Day International - 5
 T20I - 0

International match hosting problem
The venue hosted its last international match in 2006. Transportion problems, player's accommodation problems, are a few of problems for which Bangladesh Cricket Board preclude matches being hosted at the venue. Although the city has a domestic airport, it is maintained by the Bangladesh Air Force and needs prior approval for operations which makes it difficult to host international matches. The Bangladesh Cricket Board and the Government of Bangladesh are trying to solve problems related to hosting so that the venue can come back to host international matches as soon as possible.

See also
 List of international five-wicket hauls at Shaheed Chandu Stadium
 Stadiums in Bangladesh
 List of Test cricket grounds
 One-Test wonder
 List of international cricket grounds in Bangladesh

References

Further reading

External links
 CricketArchive

Sport in Bangladesh
Cricket grounds in Bangladesh
Test cricket grounds in Bangladesh
Bogura District
Sports venues completed in 2002
2002 establishments in Bangladesh